The Women's team archery event at the 2008 Summer Olympics was part of the archery programme and took place at the Olympic Green Archery Field. Ranking Round was scheduled for August 9 and elimination rounds and Finals took place on August 10. All archery is done at a range of 70 metres, with targets 1.22 metres in diameter.

As the defending Olympic champions, South Korea defended the title with only one remaining archer from the previous Games, Park Sung-hyun, winner of two gold medals. China, silver at the last Games, participated at the team event with only one Athens medalist, Zhang Juanjuan and tried to bring the gold medal to the hosts. Chinese Taipei, bronze in Athens, brought Yuan Shu Chi and Wu Hui Ju back to the Games.

10 teams qualified for the event at the Beijing Olympics: host China, plus the top 8 teams at the 44th Outdoor Archery World championship, held in Leipzig, Germany, and one other NOC that qualified three athletes for the Games.

The competition begins with the same ranking round used to determine the individual event seeding. Each archer fires 72 arrows, with the scores of the team's three members summed to give the team score. The elimination rounds use a single-elimination tournament, with fixed brackets based on the ranking round seeding. Highly ranked teams get byes through to the quarterfinals. In each round of elimination, the two teams each fire 24 arrows (with each individual archer accounting for 8 of them). The higher scoring team moves on, while the lower scoring team is eliminated. The two semifinal losers face off for the bronze medal.

Records
Prior to this competition, the existing world and Olympic records were as follows. The change from the prior 27 arrow match to a 24 arrow match for the XXIX Olympiad meant that there was no standing Olympic record in the team match.

216 arrow ranking round

24 arrow match

The following new world and Olympic records were set during this competition.

World rankings entering Olympics

Ranking Round

Elimination round

Final standings

Final Match Details

References

W
2008 in women's archery
Women's events at the 2008 Summer Olympics